Alice Miles Woodruff (November 29, 1900 – November 24, 1985), born Alice Lincoln Miles, was an American virologist. She developed a method for growing fowlpox outside of a live chicken alongside Ernest William Goodpasture.  Her research greatly facilitated the rapid advancement in the study of viruses.

Early life and education
Alice Lincoln Miles was born in Cambridge, Massachusetts, the daughter of Arthur L. Miles and Marie Augusta Putnam Miles. Her father was a dentist. She graduated from Mount Holyoke College in 1922. She obtained a master's degree in 1924 and a PhD in 1925 from Yale University.

Career 
Woodruff worked as a research assistant at Vanderbilt University from 1927 until 1931. While working with her husband and Goodpasture, she conducted studies in the "nature, infectivity, and purification of fowl-pox virus, and the character of the changes it induced on experimental infection of fowls," which became the forerunner in the cultivation of viruses.

Woodruff was a regional chair of the Women's International League for Peace and Freedom in her later years.

Personal life
She married Charles Eugene ("Gene") Woodruff on 25 August 1927. They had three children together, Alice, Mary Jean, and Charles Eugene. She was widowed when her husband died in 1980; she died in Highland, Michigan, in 1985, aged 84 years.

Bibliography

References

Yale University alumni
American virologists
Mount Holyoke College alumni
Vanderbilt University staff
1900 births
1985 deaths
People from Cambridge, Massachusetts